Stuart Mitchell (born November 2, 1964) is a former American football quarterback who played two seasons in the Arena Football League with the Denver Dynamite and Pittsburgh Gladiators. He played college football at Cornell University and attended McBurney School in Manhattan, New York.

He played quarterback, tight end, and special teams for Cornell.

References

External links
Just Sports Stats

Living people
1964 births
American football quarterbacks
Cornell Big Red football players
Denver Dynamite (arena football) players
Pittsburgh Gladiators players
Sportspeople from Brooklyn
Players of American football from New York City